Jalen Derale Wilson (born November 4, 2000) is an American college basketball player at the University of Kansas. He was named a consensus first-team All-American his junior year.

High school career
Wilson attended John H. Guyer High School in Denton, Texas. As a junior, averaged 16.1 points, 6.2 rebounds, 3.3 assists per game. As a senior, he averaged 18.1 points, 7.5 rebounds and three assists per game, earning Class 6A All-State honors.

Recruiting
Wilson was a consensus four-star recruit and was considered the 46th-best player in the 2019 class by 247Sports. He originally committed to playing college basketball for Michigan but reopened his recruitment with the departure of head coach John Beilein. He later committed to Kansas over an offer from North Carolina, among others.

College career
On November 8, 2019, Wilson suffered a broken ankle against UNC Greensboro in his second career game. He missed the remainder of the season and was granted a medical redshirt after undergoing surgery. On December 8, 2020, Wilson recorded 23 points and 10 rebounds, making a go-ahead three-pointer with 42 seconds remaining, in a 73–72 win over eighth-ranked Creighton. As a freshman, Wilson averaged 11.8 points and 7.9 rebounds per game, earning Big 12 All-Freshman Team honors. On April 9, 2021, he declared for the 2021 NBA draft while maintaining his college eligibility. Wilson ultimately returned to Kansas. On November 2, he was suspended for three games due to an arrest on suspicion of DUI. Wilson was named to the Third Team All-Big 12 as a sophomore. He averaged 11.1 points and 7.4 rebounds per game, helping the Jayhawks win a national title. Following the season Wilson declared for the 2022 NBA draft but ultimately withdrew from the draft. As a junior, Wilson was named Big 12 Player of the Year.

Career statistics

College

|-
| style="text-align:left;"| 2019–20
| style="text-align:left;"| Kansas
| 2 || 0 || 1.0 || .000 || .000 || .000 || .0 || .0 || .0 || .0 || .0
|-
| style="text-align:left;"| 2020–21
| style="text-align:left;"| Kansas
| 29 || 26 || 28.3 || .414 || .333 || .630 || 7.9 || 2.0 || .4 || .3 || 11.8
|-
| style="text-align:left;"| 2021–22
| style="text-align:left;"| Kansas
| 37 || 27 || 29.4 || .461 || .263 || .722 || 7.4 || 1.8 || .9 || .4 || 11.1
|-
| style="text-align:left;"| 2022–23
| style="text-align:left;"| Kansas
| 26 || 26 || 34.9 || .423 || .358 || .710 || 8.2 || 2.6 || .9 || .5 || 20.3
|- class="sortbottom"
| style="text-align:center;" colspan="2"| Career
|| 75 || 60 || 28.7 || .435 || .298 || .690 || 7.6 || 2.0 || .7 || .3 || 12.2

Personal life
Wilson's father, Derale, played college basketball for TCU and professionally overseas. His mother, Lisa, was an Oklahoma State basketball signee and competed for Seminole State College and Oklahoma City.

References

External links
 Kansas Jayhawks bio
 ESPN profile

2000 births
Living people
All-American college men's basketball players
American men's basketball players
Basketball players from Texas
Kansas Jayhawks men's basketball players
Small forwards
Sportspeople from Arlington, Texas